Jesus Enrique Golindano   (born January 13, 1984)  is a  Venezuelan professional baseball infielder, who is currently with Beisbol Barcelona and the Spain national baseball team.

He was signed by the Los Angeles Dodgers as an undrafted free agent and played in the Venezuelan Summer League and Gulf Coast League while in the Dodgers system. Since 2004 he has played in the División de Honor de Béisbol, primarily with Beisbol Barcelona.

He also is a member of the Spain national baseball team, participating in the 2008 European Cup, 2008 Final Four, 2011 European Cup and 2012 European Baseball Championship and 2013 World Baseball Classic.

References

External links

1984 births
Living people
Baseball catchers
Baseball infielders
Gulf Coast Dodgers players
People from Maturín
Venezuelan expatriate baseball players in the United States
2013 World Baseball Classic players